The Proton Arena (or the Proton Jumbuck in the United Kingdom, Taiwan and Australia) is a small front wheel drive coupé utility manufactured by Malaysian automaker Proton. Introduced in 2002, the Arena is the only form of pickup by Proton, and is the only Proton model to enjoy significantly more popularity in its export market than domestically.

The suspension configuration of the Arena consists of a combination of independent MacPherson strut suspensions from a saloon car at the front, and torsion beam, leaf sprung suspensions at the rear. Other modifications include the use of a rigid rear axle, an uprated front stabiliser bar, and 14" front ventilated discs and 9" rear drum brakes with load sensing proportioning valves (LSPV), and the use of reinforced high-profile tyres. Lotus Engineering provided additional ride and handling enhancements.

Similar to the car it is based on, the Arena is powered by a 1.5-litre, 12-valve Electronically Fuel Injected (EFI) Mitsubishi 4G15 engine fitted with Proton's proprietary EMS 400 engine management system. While fuel consumption is low for a utility (5.8-litre per 100 km on the highway and 8.5-litre per 100 km in the city), it was not intended for heavy duty usage, and instead fills a market segment below that occupied by larger coupé utilities.

Body design 

In Malaysia, the Arena is offered in three variants, which features a variety of cargo bed accessories and trims but does not vary mechanically from the export edition:

 The "Freestyle", the base Arena model with an open bed, exposed metal sports bars, steel rims and hubcaps.
 The "Sportdeck", an open bed variant similar to the Freestyle with covered sports bars, body trims, and alloy rims.
 The "Fastback", an upmarket variant with a hard, streamlined tonneau cover-cum-camper shell (resembling a fastback body style), body trims, and alloy rims.

In Australia, the Jumbuck was available in two variants, GLi and GLSi.
GLSi - Top of the line model featuring a gold accent around the lower half of the vehicle exterior, as well as gold accented bumper at the front and bumperettes at the rear. This model also had "all power options" such as Power Mirrors and Power Windows. Interior was cloth seats.
GLi - No power options, and vehicle body was uniform colour.

Chassis 
Like the Wira, the Arena is of unibody construction, but in order to sustain additional loads from the cargo bed, the Arena includes a load-bearing ladder frame connected to a "torque box" for improved body durability and strength.

The Torque box consists of a semi-independent ladder frame that has been bonded to the cabin and central underside of the load bed, including the front and rear suspension mounts for the rear leaf suspension.

The Vehicle Fuel Tank is also mounted to the Torque Box.

This allows loads to be transmitted from the load area of the vehicle directly into the rear suspension, without transmitting large loads into the rear firewall of the vehicle cabin, or into the outer monocoque shell of the vehicle, reducing buckling and increasing torsional stiffness of the vehicle.

At front of the Torque Box is a rear firewall, designed to integrate the front end Wira architecture into the rear Proton designed architecture. This facilitates a seamless bodyline and transition of loads through the vehicle structure, and links the torque box into the cab as a single unit.

Safety features 
While freely sold in Malaysia, no stringent third-party safety tests on the Arena were conducted or published publicly in the country.

In September 2009, the Jumbuck was crash tested by the Australasian New Car Assessment Program (ANCAP). The Jumbuck fared poorly, receiving a one-star rating out of five.

The Jumbuck lacks many of the safety features offered in other modern automobiles, such as airbags and anti-lock brakes. The absence of such safety features in an attempt to lower retail pricing is suspected to be one factor for the one-star crash test result.

Proton Cars Australia has criticised the choice of the Jumbuck for the test, arguing the vehicle is the last of an old platform and is due for a replacement in the middle of 2010, however, production of the Jumbuck finished in 2009.

The Proton Jumbuck additionally is fitted with either a 175/70R14 (88R) or 185/60R15 (88S) tyre, and a 5.5Jx14 ET40 or 6Jx15 ET40 rim.

These rims although shared with size in the Wira, and more common small cars like the Mitusbishi Lancer, they are not generally designed to be loaded with heavy weights, with a load rating of only 560 kg per tyre, and a Gross Vehicle Mass of 1,500 kg, the vehicle is running close to its designed limits on axle group loadings, especially when cornering and roll forces are applied to the vehicle.

The Jumbuck however does carry a spare tyre located under the rear of the load area, in a drop-down cradle that allows ease of access by reaching under the rear passenger step. The vehicle has a full-sized spare tyre, meaning regular highway speeds are viable when the vehicle is operated using the spare tyre.

Marketing 

In Malaysia, the Arena was often marketed for both commercial and recreational use. The stripped down Freestyle variant was specified to be targeted exclusively for a variety of commercial interests, while the Sportdeck variant was offered for both private owners and businesses. The Fastback variant, the top-of-the-line Arena, was targeted at private owners. While the three Arena variants were advertised as models for specialised tasks, all three models may be used in any way.

Although the Arena was offered in Malaysia, the Arena was not popular in the local market and was mostly an export model (particularly to the United Kingdom, Australia and South Africa, where coupé utilities are more marketable).

The Jumbuck remains a relevant model more than a decade after its British launch. Of the estimated 1,800 units registered between 2003 and 2006 in Great Britain and Northern Ireland, over 1,300 units remain licensed as of Q3 2015, with a further 153 units on SORN. Over 80% of all Proton Jumbucks sold in the UK are still  on the roads.

References

External links 
Proton Holdings Berhad
Road Vehicle Description Sheet - 28741-491604 - Proton Ute 07/08/2002
Road Vehicle Description Sheet - 28741-508977 - Proton Jumbuck 20/11/2002
Road Vehicle Description Sheet - 28741-685150 - Proton Jumbuck 30/06/2006
Road Vehicle Description Sheet - 28741-685150 - Proton Ute 30/06/2006

Compact cars
Arena
Front-wheel-drive vehicles
2010s cars
Cars introduced in 2002
Coupé utilities
Pickup trucks